Albert Martin Boddey (16 April 1907 – 24 October 1975) was a British film and television actor.

He was a founder member of the Lord's Taverners charity. Boddey started acting when he was nearly 40, often portraying irritable authority figures such as police officers or magistrates.

Selected filmography

 A Song for Tomorrow (1948) - Major
 The Third Man (1949) - Russian Military Policeman (uncredited)
 Landfall (1949) - Civilian (uncredited)
 The Twenty Questions Murder Mystery (1950) - 2nd Plainclothesman (uncredited)
 Cairo Road (1950) - Maj. Ahmed Mustafa
 State Secret (1950) - Clubman
 The Dancing Years (1950) - Minor Role (uncredited)
 Seven Days to Noon (1950) - Gen. Willoughby 
 Cage of Gold (1950) - Adams
 The Franchise Affair (1951) - Insp. Hallam
 The Adventurers (1951) - Chief Engineer
 Laughter in Paradise (1951) - Store Shopwalker
 Cloudburst (1951) - Desk Sergeant
 Valley of Eagles (1951) - Chief of the Lost Valley
 Appointment with Venus (1951) - Sgt. Vogel
 The Magic Box (1951) - Sitter in Bath Studio
 Venetian Bird (1952) - Gufo
 Top Secret (1952) - Russian Security Officer
 Folly to Be Wise (1953) - Visiting Brigadier (uncredited)
 Sailor of the King (1953) - German Officer (uncredited)
 Park Plaza 605 (1953) - Stumpy
 Personal Affair (1953) - Police Insp. Fred Garland (uncredited)
 Rob Roy, the Highland Rogue (1953) - General Cadogan
 Face the Music (1954) - Insp. Mulrooney
 Doctor in the House (1954) - Demonstrator at pedal machine
 Forbidden Cargo (1954) - Sub-Director Holt
 Seagulls Over Sorrento (1954) - Member of Admiralty Board (uncredited)
 Mad About Men (1954) - Marco (uncredited)
 Svengali (1954) - Doctor
 Up to His Neck (1955) - Chang
 Secret Venture (1955) - Squire Marlowe, the Wrestler
 The Iron Petticoat (1956) - Grisha
 The Last Man to Hang? (1956) - Detective Sgt. Horne
 Eyewitness (1956) - Police Sgt. (uncredited)
 The Silken Affair (1956) - Detective
 You Can't Escape (1956) - Insp. Crane
 There's Always a Thursday (1957) - Sergeant
 How to Murder a Rich Uncle (1957) - Police Sergeant
 These Dangerous Years (1957) 
 Man in the Shadow (1957) - Doctor (uncredited)
 Cat Girl (1957) - Cafferty
 Not Wanted on Voyage (1957) - Captain
 The Duke Wore Jeans (1958)
 No Time to Die (1958) - SS colonel
 Indiscreet (1958) - Albert (uncredited)
 Carry On Sergeant (1958) - Sixth Specialist
 Chain of Events (1958) - Bus Inspector
 The Adventures of Hal 5 (1958) - Doctor
 I Only Arsked! (1958) - (uncredited)
 The Two-Headed Spy (1958) - Gen. Optiz
 The Square Peg (1958) - (uncredited)
 Violent Moment (1959) - Nightwatchman (uncredited)
 Carry On Nurse (1959) - Perkins
 Idol on Parade (1959) - Chucker-out (uncredited)
 The Siege of Pinchgut (1959) - Brigadier
 I'm All Right Jack (1959) - Num Yum's Executive
 Killers of Kilimanjaro (1959) - Gunther
 Moment of Danger (1960) - Sir John Middleburgh
 Too Hot to Handle (1960) - Mr. Arpels
 Oscar Wilde (1960) - Insp. Richards 
 Sands of the Desert (1960) - Mertons
 A Circle of Deception (1960) - Henry Crow
 The Naked Edge (1961) - Jason Roote
 The Kitchen (1961) - Max
 The Wrong Arm of the Law (1963) - Superintendent J.S. Forest
 Girl in the Headlines (1963) - Inspector
 The Man Who Finally Died (1963) - Policeman with Dog (uncredited)
 A Man for All Seasons (1966) - Governor of Tower
 Bedazzled (1967) - Cardinal (uncredited)
 The Rise and Rise of Michael Rimmer (1970) - Major Mathieson
 Tales from the Crypt (1972) - Husband - Richard Clayton (segment 1 "And All Through The House")
 Dark Places (1973) - Sgt. Riley 
 Psychomania (1973) - Coroner
 The Naked Civil Servant (1975) - Magistrate (final film role)

References

External links

1907 births
1975 deaths
Scottish male film actors
Scottish male television actors
People from Stirling
20th-century Scottish male actors